Norman "Jelly" Jackson (September 13, 1909 – February 13, 1980) was a Negro league baseball player. He played for the Cleveland Red Sox and Homestead Grays from 1934 to 1945.

References

External links
 and Seamheads

1909 births
1980 deaths
Cleveland Red Sox players
Homestead Grays players
Baseball players from Washington, D.C.
20th-century African-American sportspeople